Shao Hong (born ) is a Chinese male politician who is currently the vice chairperson of The National Committee of the Chinese People's Political Consultative Conference.

References 

1957 births
Living people